Graptopetalum paraguayense is a species of succulent plant in the jade plant family, Crassulaceae, that is native to Tamaulipas, Mexico. Common names include mother-of-pearl-plant and ghost plant. This is not to be confused with Monotropa uniflora which is also referred to as the “Ghost plant”.
G. paraguayense has white flowers which have a form of a star. The Graptopetalum paraguayense is called the ghost plant because of the residue on the leaves making it look like a ghost.

Description
The plant has a spreading and creeping habit that reaches 20 cm high by 60 cm wide. Its appearance may vary depending on the soil and the exposure. The hanging rod can reach up to 2 m in length and a thickness of 2 cm. Green to light grey leaves can be up to 7 cm long and 3 cm wide. Thick and fleshy, they are arranged in a spiral around the stem and are very easily detached from the rosette, that is why this plant has been nicknamed "porcelain succulent".

Its flowers appearing in spring have five white petals spotted with red.

Cultivation
This hardy plant stands temperatures down to −10°C. If it is sheltered from rain and too much humidity, it is easy to grow in temperate climates. It is readily propagated by cutting leaves or stems. It supports both full sun and partial shade. Watering should be avoided in the event of excessive heat. It is often used as an ornamental plant in gardens.

Gallery

References

External links

paraguayense
Endemic flora of Mexico
Flora of Tamaulipas
Plants described in 1938
Garden plants of North America
Drought-tolerant plants
Taxa named by N. E. Brown